Sazhid Khalilrakhmanovich Sazhidov (born 6 February 1980) is a Russian Olympic wrestler who represented his country at the world-level from 2003 to 2006. He  won the bronze medal at the 2004 Athens Olympics.

At the final match 2003 FILA Wrestling World Championships he defeated Cael Sanderson of the United States, to become world champion. In 2006 he defeated Revaz Mindorashvili in the final match to again become world champ. In 2005 he placed 5th.

Sazhidov also won the world championship at the cadet level in 1995 and junior level in 1998. He won the World Military Games in 2007 as well.

He is the head coach of the Dagestan wrestling team.

He has coached the following wrestlers/athletes 
 Abdulrashid Sadulaev – Olympic gold medalist, three-time World Champion
 Abdusalam Gadisov (formerly) – World Champion
 Bekkhan Goygereev – World Champion
 Magomedrasul Gazimagomedov - World Champion
 Nariman Israpilov – European Champion and World Freestyle Wrestling Championships Bronze medalist
 Shamil Kudiyamagomedov – Silver World Cup and European Champion
 Gadzhimurad Rashidov (formerly) – Senior European Champion, silver world cup, two-time Cadet World Champion, senior World runner-up
 Ilyas Bekbulatov – European champion and a four time Ivan Yarygin winner
 Dauren Kurugliev (formerly) – European Champion, Ramzan Kadyrov runner-up & Ali Aliyev Memorial runner-up
 Akhmed Chakaev – Ali Aliyev Memorial winner, senior world 3rd
 Aaron Pico (formerly) – Junior Freestyle Wrestling Championships runner-up and runner-up U.S. Olympic and world team trials
 Khabib Nurmagomedov (formerly) – Two-time world sambo champion and former UFC lightweight champion

References

1980 births
Olympic wrestlers of Russia
Wrestlers at the 2004 Summer Olympics
Olympic bronze medalists for Russia
Living people
Olympic medalists in wrestling
Medalists at the 2004 Summer Olympics
World Wrestling Championships medalists
Russian male sport wrestlers